Cotillion Records was a subsidiary of Atlantic Records (from 1971 part of WEA) and was active from 1968 through 1985. The label was formed as an outlet for pop, R&B, and jazz. Its first single, Otis Clay's version of "She's About a Mover", reached the R&B charts. Cotillion's catalog quickly expanded to include progressive rock, folk-rock, gospel, jazz and comedy. In 1976, the label started focusing on disco and R&B. At that point, Cotillion's catalog albums outside those genres were reissued on Atlantic.

Among its acts were the post-Curtis Mayfield Impressions; Slave; Brook Benton; Young-Holt Unlimited; Freddie King; Jean Knight; Mass Production; Sister Sledge; The Velvet Underground; Slade; Stacy Lattisaw; Lou Donaldson; Mylon LeFevre; Stevie Woods; Johnny Gill; Emerson, Lake & Palmer; Garland Green; The Dynamics; The Fabulous Counts; Screaming Lord Sutch; and The Fatback Band. Herbie Mann recorded for them, and had his own record label subsidiary there, Embryo Records, in the 1970s.

Cotillion is also responsible for launching the career of Luther Vandross, who was in a three-member group called Luther (the rights now lay with his estate as he had bought them back when he was alive preventing reissues). The label also released music from the Woodstock festival in 1970.

Cotillion was closed down in 1986 and Johnny Gill, Stacy Lattisaw, Slave, and Sister Sledge were moved to its parent label Atlantic Records.

For Record Store Day 2013, Rhino Records released a 7-inch boxset entitled Cotillion Records: Soul 45s (1968–1970). It featured a selection of ten 45rpm singles from Darrell Banks, Otis Clay, Moses Smith and Baby Washington. The release was a limited edition of 2500 copies worldwide.

See also
 List of record labels

References

External links
 Discography

Warner Music labels
Atlantic Records
American record labels
Record labels established in 1968
Record labels disestablished in 1985
Soul music record labels
Progressive rock record labels
Rock record labels
Pop record labels
Jazz record labels
1968 establishments in the United States